Shiken haramitsu daikoumyo is a nine-syllable Japanese Buddhist mantra. Its kanji is 四拳 波羅蜜 大光明:
 shi-ken 四拳: (shi "four")-(ken "heart" or "fist")
 ha-ra-mitsu 波羅蜜: (ha "wave")-(ra "gauze")-(mitsu "nectar")
 dai-kou-myo 大光明: (dai "great")-(kou "light")-(myo "bright")

Shiken represents four attributes of the heart:
 Mercy, with love for everything
 Sincerity, doing what is right
 An attuned heart, following the natural order of things
 Dedication to a chosen pursuit

Haramitsu means pāramitā, or the Buddha's satori: reaching Buddhahood despite worldly distractions. 波 are waves; kanojyo wa nami ga aru ("she has waves in her mind") implies that a person is unstable from worry and confusion. 羅 is gauze, which metaphorically clouds the mind. 蜜 is the nectar of enlightenment. 大光明 (daikoumyo) is a great, bright light; 光明 literally means "a bright future" (hope). According to ninjutsu as taught by Masaaki Hatsumi, there are lessons to be learned from everything—good or bad.

References

External links
 Dai Ko Myo Revealed 
 Discussion of meaning 
 Use in Bujinkan 

Buddhist mantras